Lycinus tofo is a mygalomorph spider of Chile, named after its type locality: El Tofo, Coquimbo Region. Males are distinguished by the palpal bulb, more abruptly tapered than in other species of the genus; females by the long, slender, spiraled spermathecal receptacula.

Description
Male: total length ; cephalothorax length , width ; its cephalic region is wide and short, its width 0.61 of the thoracic width. Its fovea is narrow, occupying 0.08 of the cephalothorax width. Its labium length is 0.50 of width, while its sternum width is 0.79 of length. The labium possesses no cuspules. The cephalothorax, legs and palpi are a yellowish brown, the abdomen with a dark chevron.
Female: total length ; cephalothorax length , width ; cephalic region length , width ; fovea width ; medial ocular quadrangle length , width ; labium length , width ; sternum length , width . Its cephalic region is short, wide and very convex, while its fovea is slightly procurved with recurved ends. Its labium possesses no cuspules. A serrula is absent. The sternal sigilla I is small and almost circular; II is oval; posterior sigilla is shallow, twice as long as wide. The sternum is weakly rebordered. Chelicerae: rastellum is formed by strong blunt setae (similar to L. longipes, but the setae are slightly longer and thicker). Its cephalothorax, legs and palpi are blackish-reddish brown, while its abdomen is gray, with darker parallel lines.

Distribution and Behaviour
Southern Region III and northern Region IV, in burrows with double flaps.

See also
Spider anatomy
List of Nemesiidae species
Regions of Chile

References

External links

ADW entry

Nemesiidae
Spiders of South America
Spiders described in 1995
Endemic fauna of Chile